Millers (also spelled Miller's)  is a ghost town located in Esmeralda County, Nevada. Deserted today, Millers sprang up as a mining boomtown after the Tonopah boom began. A highway rest-stop is located there, resulting in Millers still being listed on many travel maps.

History
Millers came to life as a result of the furor in Tonopah. In 1901 the Tonopah and Goldfield Railroad was constructed and by 1904 Millers was founded as a station and watering stop along the rail line. The name of the town honors Charles R. Miller, a director of the railroad who was also once the Governor of Delaware. Miller also worked as vice president of the Tonopah Mining Company and played a key role in bringing that company's 100-stamp cyanide mill built in Millers in 1906. The Post Office at Millers was in operation from January 1906 until September 1919 and then from February 1921 until December 1931. In 1907 the railroad company constructed repair shops in Millers and another large mill went up. By 1910 Millers had a business district and a population of 274. A year later, in 1911, the railroad shops and mill had moved and the town began a slow decline. By 1941, Millers had 28 inhabitants. When the railroad went under in 1947 the town of Millers followed suit and became a ghost town.

References

Ghost towns in Esmeralda County, Nevada
Ghost towns in Nevada
Nevada historical markers
Mining communities in Nevada
Populated places established in 1904